The International Soccer League was a U.S.-based soccer league which was formed in 1960 and collapsed in 1965. The League, affiliated with the American Soccer League, featured guest teams primarily from Europe and some from Asia, South America, Canada and Mexico.

The creation of the League was announced in January 1960, when it was regarded as an attempt to create a Club World Cup. However, the concurrence of the UEFA/CONMEBOL-endorsed Intercontinental Cup, launched also in 1960, nullified any possibility that the League might have relevance as a club world championship.

History 
In  1960, William D. Cox, a wealthy U.S. businessman and former owner of the Philadelphia Phillies, a U.S. baseball team, saw a potential market in the United States for top-level soccer. Recognizing that U.S. teams did not play at a sufficiently high level to attract the attention of most fans, he began to consider the possibility of importing European and South American teams during their league off-seasons. Traditionally, tours by European clubs in the northeast United States had drawn well and Cox decided to pursue this approach.

However, soccer in the U.S. was run by the U.S. Soccer Football Association (USSFA). As a member of the soccer's international governing organization, FIFA, the USSFA had the sole power in the U.S. to authorize the creation of a new league, and any league created without USSFA authority would be declared an "outlaw league". Any person playing in an "outlaw league" would then be banned from playing in any other league or team affiliated with FIFA, and as nearly every league and team in the world was affiliated with the world soccer body, this would effectively ban a player from playing soccer anywhere.

To get USSFA approval, Cox worked through the existing American Soccer League, a USSFA-recognized league. This went so far that in 1961, the ASL scheduled only one game during the ISL season in order to keep from drawing fan support from the league. Each year, the ISL played two halves to its season, with different sets of teams; the top team from each half played each other in a season-ending championship game. In order to give the American fans a greater stake in the league, Cox also decided to enter a team of U.S.-based players; this team, called variably New York, the New Yorkers and the New York Americans, was usually a mix of U.S.-based European professionals with some native all-stars. Cox also gained regional television coverage, and the associated revenue stream. While the games were initially played in the New York metropolitan area, as interest in the ISL increased, he expanded the league to Chicago, Detroit, Boston and Los Angeles.

The ISL lasted only through the end of the 1965 season before folding, not so much by its continuing financial losses (some $100,000 over five seasons), but due to the continuing hostility of the USSFA. The ISL's growing success, combined with Cox’ refusal to allow USSFA a part in the league management, led to the USSFA's fear losing control of soccer in the United States. In 1965 the organization forbade Cox from importing teams into the U.S. and threatened to declare the ISL an outlaw league. Cox was forced to fold the ISL, but sued USSFA in federal court for anti-trust violations, a suit he eventually won. While the ISL played its last season in 1965, the model was used again in 1967 when the United Soccer Association (USA) imported foreign teams to populate its league and again in 1969 when the North American Soccer League (NASL) used imported teams for the first half of its season.

In 1967, Cox joined with several other investors to found the National Professional Soccer League, a non-USSFA sanctioned league which, the following year, merged with the US to become the NASL.

List of champions 
Teams were divided into two groups (Section I and Section II) where they played a single round-robin tournament. Teams placed first in each group, played a final match to decide a champion.

American Challenge Cup 
In 1962, the ISL initiated an annual challenge cup.  It would pair the winner of the previous year's Challenge Cup winner with the current season's league champion.  Dukla Prague had won the 1961 title, defeating Everton F.C. 7–2 and 2–0 in the championship.  Therefore, they were paired in the first Challenge Cup with the 1962 season winner, América RJ.  Dukla won and returned for the next three challenge cups, winning each, except for the last in which they fell to Polonia Bytom.

List of champions 

Notes

League MVP 
Beginning in 1961, the league champion was awarded the Dwight D. Eisenhower trophy, but from 1962 to 1965 it was given to the league MVP. However, in 1960 and 1961 the best players in the tournament were Ademir da Guia (Bangu) and Válter Santos (Bangu) respectively.

Teams participations 
Winning years are indicated in bold

References

External links
 Annual standings by Dave Litterer on Sover.net (archived)
 U.S. Soccer History Chapter 8. The 1960s: The Birth of the American Soccer Renaissance on Ayso88.org (archived)
 Series on Pitch Invasion.net by Tom Dunmore from 2011 (archived):
 Part 1: They Even Cheered Technique: The International Soccer League 
 Part 2: In Lieu of Giants 
 Part 3: Expanded Dreams 
 Part 4: Struggling Towards Orbit 

 
Defunct soccer leagues in the United States
Defunct soccer leagues in Canada
1960 establishments in the United States
1965 disestablishments in the United States
American soccer friendly trophies
Canadian soccer friendly trophies